Survivor: Pearl Islands is the second season of the Israeli edition of Survivor. The season was filmed during June and July 2008, in the Pearl Islands, Panama. It was aired on Channel 10 from December 24, 2008 until May 23, 2009, when Arik Alper was named the Sole Survivor over Mirit Vaknin. Vaknin was named the audience's favorite player by winning a public vote.

Format changes
This season largely retained the format from the previous season, with several changes:

Hidden immunity idols: A concept from the American production, hidden immunity idols are small trinkets that, when played on a castaway after the votes were cast at Tribal Council but before they were read, negated all votes cast against them at that Tribal Council.
Exile Island: Another concept from the American production, Exile Island is a secluded location where castaways were banished from their tribemates for a night or two; in this version, following each Immunity Challenge, two castaways were sent to Exile Island, where they competed in a duel for a clue to a hidden immunity idol.
Individual immunity challenge and veto challenge: The Double-Power challenge from the previous season was changed. Instead, before the merge, the members of the tribe that lost the immunity challenge competed in a challenge for individual immunity in that night's Tribal Council. After the merge, the castaways competed for the power to block a tribemate from voting in that night's Tribal Council, in the form of a veto bracelet that they would give to the player whose vote they are blocking.
Endgame: At the end of the game, the remaining castaways were subjected to a public vote. During the live finale months after the game's conclusion, the player with the fewest votes was eliminated, automatically joining the jury. The now-completed jury then cast their votes for the winner, which were read immediately afterward.

Contestants

Future appearances
Mirit Vaknin, Maayan Porter and Natan Bashevkin returned for Survivor: Fans vs. Survivors. Idan Haviv returned for the 2020 season of Survivor: VIP.

Guy Geyor became the "Bachelor" on the Israeli edition of The Bachelor

Season summary

Survivor Auction

Episode summaries

Voting history

References

External links 
 Official Survivor 10 website 

Pearl Islands
Channel 10 (Israeli TV channel) original programming
2008 Israeli television seasons
2009 Israeli television seasons
Reality television articles with incorrect naming style
Television shows filmed in Panama